Leviathan Falls is a science fiction novel by James S. A. Corey, the pen name of Daniel Abraham and Ty Franck, and the ninth and final book of the series The Expanse. The title and cover art were announced by the authors at a virtual fan announcement on September 16, 2020 and the book was released November 30, 2021. The title echoes the title of the initial book in the series, Leviathan Wakes.  The book won the 2022 Dragon Award for Best Science Fiction Novel.

Plot summary 

On Laconia, Winston Duarte seems to waken from the semi-catatonic state caused by a time-warping event. He projects himself into Trejo's mind, who is in the Sol system reconquering it for the Laconian Empire. Duarte thanks Trejo for holding the Empire together, and tells him they were thinking too small in their empire-building vision. Duarte vanishes, and Trejo orders the ship to return to the Laconia system.

When Trejo returns to Laconia, Duarte had already left the state building and disappeared. Trejo dispatches Colonel Aliana Tanaka to find him, giving her the highest possible level of clearance. She tracks Duarte to the cave Amos Burton lived in. Tanaka goes further into the cave network and determines that Duarte likely left in an alien ship. She decides the best way to find him is to use Teresa as a lure, so she sets out to find her. Her investigation turns up a relative of Duarte who runs a girls' boarding school on one of the colony worlds and decides to investigate it as a likely location for Teresa to be sent.

Elvi is investigating the Adro Diamond with a full science team and the two children who died on Laconia and were revived by the repair drones (now essentially immortal since their aging process was halted by the change), Xan and Cara. They use the catalyst to trigger interactions between Cara and the Jupiter-sized diamond to dive into the library. Some of Cara's experiences during the dives bleed over into Amos, who has been altered in the same way during the events of Tiamat's Wrath.

The Rocinante and its crew (Jim, Naomi, Alex, Amos, and Teresa, who has become an apprentice to Amos) are avoiding Laconian ships as Naomi continues to run the underground. They transit the ring space to take Teresa to New Egypt and the boarding school. They see a Laconian ship, and decide to land on New Egypt with the planet between them.

Jim and Amos accompany Teresa to the school and are met by Tanaka and a team of Laconian marines. After a fire-fight, Jim, Amos, and Teresa escape to the Rocinante and launch into orbit. After a battle with a Laconian frigate, they transit the ring space to the Freehold system, home of Draper Station and a safe place to resupply. Unfortunately, a Laconian ship is in the system trying to coax the underground to surrender the Gathering Storm by threatening the Freehold populace. It is suspicious of the Rocinante, and alerts Tanaka.

The Rocinante covertly makes its way to Draper Station for resupply. Colonel Tanaka arrives in the system and transmits a message from Trejo to Naomi. It is an offer of armistice and alliance between the Laconian Empire and the underground; Naomi's protocols and oversight for gate travel, withdrawal of Laconian forces, and Teresa to be returned to them.

The crew agree that Trejo's requests are unreasonable. However, Jillian Houston takes things into her own hands; she locks the Rocinante crew into their quarters, accepts the Laconian offer, and invites an envoy to collect the girl. Tanaka comes with no real intention to honor the deal. Shortly after the meeting begins, Tanaka kills Jillian's guards and begins searching the station for Teresa.

Jillian releases the Rocinante crew who then launch and run for the ring gate. The Gathering Storm, with Jillian in command, is destroyed covering the Rocinantes escape. Amos convinces the crew to go to the Adro system to meet Elvi and join the effort to learn the secrets of the big-green-diamond. The Rocinante makes the ring space transit into the Adro system just before Tanaka, on the Derecho, enters the ring space and loses the trail.

The search of the ring space for the trail of the Rocinante leads Tanaka and the crew of the Derecho incorrectly to the Bara Gaon system. During the search a large ship transits into the ring space from the Sol system, and apparently begins the process of being annihilated ("to go Dutchman"). However, partway through the process, it goes back to normal and survives. Those inside the ring space and aboard that ship simultaneously have a strange experience - they share others' memories. As this happens, the rings begin brightly glowing, inside and out.

The mysterious entities who killed the ring builder civilization (the "dark gods", the "ring entities") have been attempting to kill humans by various means. Most of these attempts don't have too much effect on humans, other than occasionally causing short-term unconsciousness. However, one event in the San Esteban system resulted in all but the most basic life in the entire system being killed, but the continued traffic through the system's gate prevents the entities from concluding the effectiveness of their experiment.

After the Rocinante reaches Elvi and Fayez on the Falcon in the Adro system, they decide to do a dual dive into the library involving both Cara and Amos. During the dive Winston Duarte appears and tells them that all humanity must join him in creating a hive mind. He's already taken the first steps and can prevent the ring entities from attacking or making ships go Dutchman. Following the dual dive, Amos tells Elvi the dives with Cara need to stop (for ethical reasons), and she agrees.

On Bara Gaon 5, Tanaka realizes they followed the wrong ship. Tanaka is troubled with the experience of other people's memories. After losing control during a routine interaction with a physician, she decides to have a psychiatric evaluation. The psychiatrist provides Tanaka medication intended to reduce the "shared-memories" experience. The medication helps, but the problem is spreading to those who weren't in the ring space at the time, so she brings extra medication for herself and others. She receives word that Laconian scientists believe they've found the egg ship Duarte took; it's on the surface of the Ring Station.

Elvi and the Rocinante crew also learn that Duarte is most likely on the Ring Station, and make preparations to go there. Naomi sends Trejo a message accepting his offer, and also provides the data relating to the dual dive experiment. She then sends all the data in Trejo's original message to everyone in the underground, and has the underground send as many ships as possible to the Ring Space. Trejo orders Tanaka to get Duarte back or take control.

After arriving in the slow zone it is decided that Tanaka will go into the ring station with Teresa to look for Duarte. They perform a dive with Amos; it does not go well, and when he returns says that Duarte is unhappy with their efforts to stop him.

Jim injects himself with protomolecule, reconnecting him to Miller and the ring station. Jim joins Tanaka and Teresa to go to the ring station, gain access, and begin the search for Duarte.

As more ships arrive in the Ring Space some of the incoming ships break contact; as Duarte continues building his hive-mind he has gained control over their crews and is bringing them to stop those who oppose him.

The team inside the ring station find Duarte tied into the station where he is creating his hive-mind and holding back the "dark gods". After Teresa unsuccessfully tries to free Duarte, Tanaka proceeds to kill him, simultaneously ending the hive-mind and freeing the dark gods to continue their attack on humanity. Tanaka is killed in the struggle with Duarte. Jim connects himself to the station and holds the dark gods back as Teresa escapes and the ships, including the Rocinante and Falcon, all exit the slow zone.

After the slow zone is completely empty, Holden destroys the ring station, saving humanity as it was the way the dark gods accessed the human universe. The ring gates all collapse and begin falling towards their local stars - the 1,300 colony systems are on their own.

In an epilogue, 1,000 years later a team from The Thirty Worlds -- a federation of 30 colony worlds -- journeys to Earth. On Earth they are greeted by Amos Burton.

Sources

References

External links

2021 American novels
American science fiction novels
Novels by James S. A. Corey
Space opera novels
The Expanse
Orbit Books books